Dendrobium secundum, also known as the toothbrush orchid, is a species of flowering plant in the genus Dendrobium of the family Orchidaceae. The common name refers to the fact that all the flowers are on the same side of the stem, much like the bristles all on one side of a toothbrush.

Dendrobium secundum is a Pseudobulb epiphyte. It lives in diverse habitats throughout Southeast Asia, including Andaman & Nicobar Islands, Thailand, Philippines, Peninsular Malaysia, Java, Borneo, Sumatra, Sulawesi, Indo-China and Lesser Sunda Islands.

the Dendrobium secundem lives wildly in more tropical areas like above, and the flowering times may differ depending on temperature, water, sun/shade and climate. If you look after it well it has one season where it just grows then opens its flowers.

References

External links
 Photos

secundum
Flora of Indo-China
Flora of Malesia
Plants described in 1825
Taxa named by Carl Ludwig Blume